The Massachusetts Expand Slot Machine Gaming Initiative was a 2016 Massachusetts ballot measure. Also known as Question 1, it was an indirect initiated state statute question that would allow the Massachusetts Gaming Commission to issue an additional license for another slot machine parlor to exist in the state. The referendum question said that the extra slots parlor could only be permitted on a site that was at least 4 acres (1.6 ha) in size and located within 1,500 feet (460 m) of a racecourse. The only location in the state where this would have applied was Suffolk Downs in East Boston.

 A "yes" vote would allow a second slots parlor to exist in Massachusetts.
 A "no" vote would leave the current number of one slots parlor place.

Results
The measure was not approved, voting was 57% "no", 37% "yes", and 6% left blank.

References

2016 Massachusetts ballot measures
2016 Massachusetts elections
Casinos in Massachusetts